Georges Augustus Gaston De Coppens (1836–1862) was a Confederate States Army officer during the American Civil War who was killed at the Battle of Antietam.

De Coppens was born in France, where he attended the Marine Academy before moving with the rest of his family to New Orleans. He became known as an avid military arts student, and as a frequent duelist, a notable occasion being a duel with an opera critic named Emile Bozonier. After joining the Confederate army, he received permission from President Jefferson Davis to form a Zouave battalion. Six companies were organized for twelve months service at Pensacola, under Lieutenant Colonel Georges Auguste Gaston Coppens and Major Waldemar Hylested. Two of Colonel Coppens’ brothers served in the battalion and his father, Baron August de Coppens, served as Quartermaster. His 1st Louisiana Zouaves joined the Army of Northern Virginia during the Peninsula Campaign. At the Battle of Sharpsburg, Coppens was put in temporary command of the 8th Florida Infantry Regiment. He does not show up in records again until he was listed in the casualties.

References

Confederate States Army officers
1836 births
1862 deaths
French emigrants to the United States
Confederate States of America military personnel killed in the American Civil War